Live! is a live album released by the Washington, D.C.-based go-go band the Huck-A-Bucks on December 12, 1995. The album consists of ten tracks including the singles "Kombat", "The Bud", and the go-go rendition of E-40's "Sprinkle Me".

Track listing

Personnel
Adapted from AllMusic

Mike Baker – bass guitar
Blue Eye Darryl – drums
DeCarlos Cunningham – keyboards
Rob "R.J" Folson – keyboards
Sequan Jones – congas, percussion
Kenny – congas
Lorenzo – keyboards
Lamont Ray – percussion, vocals
Felix Stevenson – drums
Joseph Timms – rapping, vocals
Charles Yancy – percussion, vocals
Roy Battle – engineer, mixing, producer

References

1995 live albums
Huck-A-Bucks albums